Suryapet mandal is one of the 23 mandals in Suryapet district of the Indian state of Telangana. It is under the administration of Suryapet revenue division with its headquarters at Suryapet. The mandal is located on the banks of Musi river which separates it from Kethepally mandal and is bounded by Jajireddigudem, Athmakur (S), Chivvemla and Penpahad mandals. The density of population of the mandal is the highest of all the mandals in the district with 748.

Towns and villages 

 census of India, the mandal has 19 settlements. It includes 1 town, 2 partial out growths and 16 villages.

The settlements in the mandal are listed below:

Notes
(†) Mandal headquarter

References

Mandals in Suryapet district